

Biography 

Anne Poelina is a Nyikina Warrwa Traditional Custodian from the Mardoowarra, lower Fitzroy River, in Western Australia. An adjunct professor and senior research fellow at the Nulungu Research Institute at the University of Notre Dame Australia, Poelina has worked on issues of environmental and cultural protection in the Kimberley of Western Australia. She is managing director of the Indigenous not-for-profit organisation Madjulla, based in Broome.
 
Poelina is the current chair of the Martuwarra Fitzroy River Council. Poelina is an active Indigenous community leader, human and earth rights advocate, filmmaker and a respected academic researcher, with a Master of Public Health and Tropical Medicine, Master of Education, Master of Arts (Indigenous social policy) and currently Doctor of Philosophy (health science) with thesis title, 'Cultural Determinants of Indigenous Health and Wellbeing’. In 2019, Poelina co-authored a paper titled ''Why Universities need to declare an Ecological and Climate Emergency'.

In 2017, Poelina was awarded with the Women’s Creativity in Rural Life Award from the Women’s World Summit Foundation based in Geneva. She was a finalist in the Western Australia Rural Woman of the Year in 2010 and the 2011 Peter Cullen Fellow for Water Leadership. She is also a co-author of and signatory to the Redstone Statement prepared at the 1st International Summit on Indigenous Environmental Philosophy in 2010. In 2011, she served as the inaugural chair of the First Peoples Water Engagement Council and was elected onto the Broome Shire Council. During her first term in office, she became deputy shire president.

Poelina grew up in Broome, near Derby, Western Australia.

References

External links 
 Martuwarra Fitzroy River Council.
 Madjulla Inc.
 Twitter.

Indigenous Australians from Western Australia
Living people
People from the Kimberley (Western Australia)
Year of birth missing (living people)